Silvio Pestrin Farina (Buenos Aires, 1975) is an Argentinian businessman and systems developer. He is the creator of FictionCity, an online social network founded in Buenos Aires for artists.

Professional life
Pestrin Farina studied computer engineering at the University of Belgrano in 1992. In 1998, he started his career at the Inter-American Development Bank (IDB) as a Java and Visual Basic language developer. In 1999, he became involved in the founding of Patagon.com, one of the world's first online banks, which was later sold to Banco Santander Central Hispano for $705 million.

FictionCity.net 

In 2009, Pestrin Farina founded FictionCity, a social networking site for artists and companies looking to connect with artistic talent. The project was completed over fourteen months with an initial investment of $1 million. The site officially launched in January 2011. Within sixty days of launching, the website's value grew to over $18 million. The Director of CIO América Marcelo Lozano described the growth as "Un Hubble para descubrir nuevas estrellas (a telescope to discover new stars)". Later that year, Farina was described as one of the three most innovative recent digital entrepreneurs to come out of Argentina. The site has over 150,000 users in 31 countries, been translated into twelve languages, and expanded to open offices in Santiago, São Paulo, Miami, Mexico City, and Barcelona.

References 

Living people
Argentine businesspeople
1975 births